Closer to the Source is the sixth solo album by Leroy Hutson. It was released in February 1978 on Curtom Records.

Track listing
 "In the Mood" (James Mendell) – 6:24
 "Where Did Love Go?" (Leroy Hutson, Gil Askey) – 4:01
 "They've Got Love" (Connie Davis, James Mendell) – 4:04
 "Get to This (You'll Get to Me)" (Michael Hawkins, Leroy Hutson, Lonnie Reaves) – 3:40
 "Closer to the Source" (Leroy Hutson, Lonnie Reaves, Alfonso Surrett) – 6:08
 "Heaven Right Here (On Earth)" (Leroy Hutson, Lonnie Reaves) – 5:31
 "Everybody's a Masterpiece" (George Clinton, Richard Reicheg) – 3:02
 "You're a Winner" (Leroy Hutson) – 4:31

Personnel
 Phil Upchurch, Ross Traut, Stephen Harris, Tom Ferrone - Guitar
 Al Radford, Bernard Reed, Larry Williams, Louis Satterfield - Bass
 Floyd Morris, James Mendell, Lonnie Reaves, Tom Washington - Keyboards
 Andre Fischer, Donnell Hagan - Drums
 Billy Howell, Donald Myrick, Elmer Brown, George Patterson, Jerry Wilson, Louis Satterfield, Michael Harris, Willie Henderson - Horns
 Earl DeRouen, Henry Gibson - Percussion
 Bobby Christian - Vibraphone
 The Curtom Strings - Strings
 Alfonso Surrett, Charles Beadle, Hank Ricks, Jackie Johnson, Jerline Brandy, Linda Clifford, Marie Marsh, Rickie Linton, Sherline Shelton - Backing Vocals

Charts

Singles

References

External links 
 Leroy Hutson-Closer To The Source at Discogs

1978 albums
Leroy Hutson albums
Albums produced by Gil Askey
Curtom Records albums